Hunter Lake is a proposed  reservoir to be created in Illinois, United States, by damming Horse Creek, a tributary of the Sangamon River.  If the lake is built, its construction would flood a section of bottomland in southeastern Sangamon County, Illinois near the city of Springfield to an elevation of 571 feet above sea level.  The lake is a project of City Water, Light & Power, the local municipal electric utility.

History and today
The Hunter Lake project was first mooted in the 1950s, after a severe drought in the summer of 1954 caused City Water, Light & Power's operating reservoir, Lake Springfield, to temporarily lose much of its storage capacity.  Since 1954, although the severe drought of that year has not reoccurred, continued fluctuations in runoff from the Lake Springfield drainage zone has caused the lake's level to rise and fall in cycles that cannot be predicted ahead of time, and diverge much more from the lake's mean water level than had been predicted when the lake was built in the 1920s and 1930s.  This has led to calls for the construction of Hunter Lake as a buffer lake.  Water would be pumped out of, or into, Hunter Lake from Lake Springfield, in order to maintain the water level of the parent lake close to a stable level.

If Hunter Lake is built, it will provide an potential additional  of water per day for City Water, Light & Power, and the city of Springfield. The lake's level will be managed for storage capacity purposes, which means that the lake level will fluctuate sharply with variation in precipitation. Creeks that will flow into the lake will sometimes alternate between being estuaries and mud flats. For this reason, Hunter Lake will not be an ideal reservoir for some forms of shoreline recreation, such as swimming. Because the lake's level would fluctuate over time, much of this buffer zone would be under water part of the time, and damp or dry in other seasons.

City Water, Light & Power has purchased land to be flooded for Hunter Lake and provide the buffer zone, completed engineering studies for the lake, and begun to seek permits from higher governmental authorities to construct a dam and fill the lake.  As of 2016, the United States Army Corps of Engineers (USACE) has intervened with the Illinois Environmental Protection Agency (IEPA) to delay, or prevent, approval of the lake project.  The separate approvals of both the Army Corps and the IEPA are required to permit the project to go forward, and, as of 2016, the Army Corps has requested that a supplemental environmental impact study be prepared before this permit application can be considered.  

Springfield has already spent $20 million to purchase land to be used for Hunter Lake's bed.  The total cost of the project, as of 2016, is loosely estimated at $106 million.

Concerns
Hunter Lake concerns, raised by the Army Corps of Engineers in September 2011, included: (a) the age, in years, of the information contained in the original environmental impact study (EIS) submitted by CWLP, (b) changes and additions to EIS law that have taken place since the original EIS was submitted, (c) inadequate consideration of the adaptive re-use of existing Sangamon County gravel pits as a potential water storage capacity alternative, and (d) inadequate consideration of the drilling of groundwater wells into a Central Illinois aquifer or aquifers as a potential alternative supplemental water supply.

Additional concerns raised as of 2016 include: (e) inadequate consideration of improving the water capacity of existing Lake Springfield by dredging the lake, (f) potential for the fluctuating Hunter Lake to become a place for mosquitoes to breed, (g) the impact of Hunter Lake on the neighboring municipalities of Divernon, Pawnee, and Virden, (h) stagnant water-consumption growth patterns in Springfield that call into question the cost-benefit assumptions made by the original planning documents, and (i) algae blooms in the proposed lake's shallow water.  The village of Pawnee, in public comments, has expressed concerns about the Hunter Lake reservoir proposal.

Anti-lake advocates say CWLP will probably never get USACE planning permission to build the lake, and its proposed use as a secondary source for electric-power generation would be better served by using its footprint as a site for solar power or wind power.

References

Springfield, Illinois